Luskin's was an electronics chain based in Baltimore, Maryland, that was founded in 1948 and ceased operation in October 1996.

Beginnings 

Luskin's began as an ice supply company founded by Jack Luskin and his brother Joe in 1948, growing into a chain of electronics stores that later reached a total of 60 in Maryland; Washington, D.C., and Virginia. Luskin would later be known as "the cheapest guy in town", a phrase that would be used for many years in Luskin's advertisements.

In 1985, Luskin's went public, though by 1996 the stock was selling from nine to twenty-one cents.

Controversies 

In 1981, the Maryland Attorney General's Consumer Protection Division took Luskin's to court over deceptive advertising prices on three occasions. A settlement would be reached; though Luskin's was still in court for a separate incident at the time the closing was announced.

Other controversies included a July 1992 promotion of certificates for free airfare and discounted hotel rates that the Attorney General's office claimed were deceptive. A later version that was slightly modified (removing the word free) was submitted for approval and began airing in September. When the Attorney General's Consumer Protection Division protested; contending that in order to qualify, one would have to buy at least $200 worth of merchandise; followed by making hotel and other arrangements through a Florida-based firm named Vacation Ventures; on December 11, 1992, Harford County judge Cypert O. Whitfill wrote in an opinion that Luskin's planned advertisements were "neither deceptive nor unfair".

Aftermath 

At the time Luskin's closing was made public, Cary Luskin (the son of company founder Jack) also announced plans to launch a separate chain of electronics stores called The Big Screen Store. Jack Luskin died on December 1, 2017, in West Palm Beach, Florida at the age of 89.  Daughter Jamie was a co-owner of the Los Angeles Dodgers from 2004 to 2012 before the team was sold following a divorce from ex-husband Frank McCourt.

Slogans 

Jack and Joe will save you dough (used until 1966; when the brothers ended their partnership)
The Cheapest Guy in Town

References 

Defunct retail companies of the United States
Retail companies established in 1948
Retail companies disestablished in 1996
Consumer electronics retailers in the United States
Defunct consumer electronics retailers in the United States
Defunct companies based in Baltimore
1948 establishments in Maryland
1996 disestablishments in Maryland